Rheocles wrightae, is a species of rainbowfish in the subfamily Bedotiinae, the Madagascar rainbowfishes. It is endemic to Madagascar where its occurs in the Manambola River, near Anosibe. It is threatened by habitat loss. It was described by Melanie Stiassny in 1990 from a type locality given as "Sandrangato River, south of Moramanga". The specific name honours the American primatologist Patricia Wright.

References

wrightae
Fish described in 1990
Taxonomy articles created by Polbot